Raven Rock is a  rural unincorporated community located along U.S. Route 421 in the Upper Little River Township in Harnett County, North Carolina, United States, west of the town of Lillington.

Origins
Raven Rock has its origins dating back to the late 1700s when Gilbert Patterson crashed in the area. His sailed alone in his canoe to get to his new plantation and coming back, Patterson crashed along the rocks in the Cape Fear River and was stranded for three days. He eventually dragged himself to a massive rock towering him over and the name of the rock became Patterson's Rock. In the latter part of the 1700s, The Samuel Northington Sr. family of Sussex County, Virginia came to the area and set up a modest village near the Cape Fear River. He established a plantation, grist mill, general store, and Ferry in the Raven Rock area. By 1838, the Northington family moved to Alabama. At this time, many other families moved into the area and established plantations, predominately the Felix and Evelyn Josephine Cranor McKay family of Buies Creek, North Carolina in the early 1850s. They owned land until 1968 when the last family members in the area sold land to the state to establish the Raven Rock State Park in 1969. During the Civil War period to 1909, there was a post office located within the community called Norval. Norval is a derivative of the Northington family name and after the post office became defunct, the name of the community was later changed to Raven Rock due to the ravens roosting on the rock.

Cemeteries

There are three cemeteries located within the community: Northington Family Cemetery and the slave cemetery are located along the path to the Raven Rock. Northington's Ferry Cemetery, near the Cape Fear River, is where many of the residents of the area are buried. The last burial documented was Laura McKoy McNeill in 1937. This cemetery is now defunct. The last is Arnold Family Cemetery, located on the McNeill property owned by Ephraim Lanier Arnold and R. A. McNeill.

Demographics

Prominent families in the Raven Rock area in the past and present would include: McLean, McNeill, McKoy, McKay, Cummings, Worrell, Fuquay, Loudermilk, Judd, Lett, Smith, Ellerby, Marsh, Arnold, Wilson, Douglas, McDougald, and Jones families.

Many of the progenitors of these families would include: James and Bella McLean, Robin and Mariah McKoy McLean, Ephraim and Sarah Campbell Arnold, Samuel and Annie Douglas McLean, Payton and Judah Lett, Sandy F. McNeill, Lonzie and Aline Buie McLean, C. C. and Mary Lou Patterson Cummings, James and Cherry Harrington Arnold, Henry and Betsy McLean Judd, Ben and Clara McLean McKoy, Sampson and Madie Peoples Marsh, Mollie Champion Ellerby, John Fuquay, Ruffin and Adeline Buchanan Douglas, George and Mary McDougald McLean, William and Adelaide McLean Jones, and Glasco and Hannah McLean.

Raven Rock Presbyterian Church and Rock Springs Free Will Baptist Church are the only religious structures in the area.

References

Unincorporated communities in North Carolina
Unincorporated communities in Harnett County, North Carolina